Yang Berhormat Datuk  Mohd. Arifin bin Mohd. Arif (born 8 May 1963) is a Malaysian politician who is serving as the State Minister of Special Tasks. He has served as the Member of Sabah State Legislative Assembly (MLA) for Membakut since March 2004. He is a member of the Parti Gagasan Rakyat Sabah (GAGASAN) and Gabungan Rakyat Sabah (GRS) coalition.

Election results

Honours 
 Sabah:
  Commander of the Order of Kinabalu (PGDK) - Datuk (2008)

References

Members of the Sabah State Legislative Assembly
1963 births
Malaysian people of Bruneian descent
Malaysian United Indigenous Party politicians
Living people
Malaysian people of Malay descent
Commanders of the Order of Kinabalu
Former United Malays National Organisation politicians